Zhu Futang (November 28, 1899 – April 23, 1994) was a Chinese pediatrician known for his research on the prevention of measles. He is considered the founder of modern Chinese pediatrics.

Biography
Zhu's aunt Zhu Xixian, an educator, had a major influence in Zhu's childhood.

He studied at Peking Union Medical College under Luther Emmett Holt. Upon graduation in 1927, he studied at the State University of New York in the United States, where he earned his M.D. From 1931 to 1933, Zhu went to the Department of Pediatrics, Harvard Medical School for advanced training and research.

In 1955, Zhu was elected an academician of the Chinese Academy of Sciences.

Scientific papers 
 Sex, Age and Seasonal Distribution of Tetany in the Orphanages in Peking, American Journal of the Medical Sciences. 177(4):559-563, April 1929.
 Use of the Placental Extract in Prevention and Modification of Measles, Am J Dis Child. 45(3):475-479, March 1933.

Notable students 
Hu Yamei, academician of the Chinese Academy of Engineering

Family 
Zhu's grandfather was a TCM physician, while his father was a primary school teacher. Zhu married Zhu Ding in 1924. She died of liver cancer in 1982.

References 

1899 births
1994 deaths
20th-century Chinese physicians
Chinese paediatricians
Educators from Wuxi
Physicians from Jiangsu
Scientists from Wuxi
Members of the Chinese Academy of Sciences
Peking Union Medical College alumni
State University of New York alumni
Harvard Medical School alumni
Chinese expatriates in the United States